The LVIII Legislature of the Congress of Sonora meets from September 2006 to September 2009. All members of the Congress were elected in the 2006 Sonora state election.

The LVIII Legislature consists of 14 deputies from the Institutional Revolutionary Party (PRI), 13 deputies from the National Action Party (PAN), 3 deputies from the Party of the Democratic Revolution (PRD), 2 deputies form the New Alliance Party and 1 deputy form the Labor Party.

Composition

Congress of Sonora

References